Tumkur may refer to:

 Tumkur, an industrial town in southwestern Karnataka, India
 Tumkur district, the administrative district of which Tumkur is the seat
 Tumkur, Shahapur, a village in Shahapur Taluka, Yadgir district, Karnataka, India